The Queen's Throat: Opera, Homosexuality, and the Mystery of Desire is a 1993 book by  Wayne Koestenbaum.

Summary
Koestenbaum explores the relationship between gay men and opera, with frequent reference to his own experiences. In particular, he finds a strong identification of the "opera queen" with the "diva." His connection between the two is the voice: he describes it as genderless, and it both allows female singers to become vicarious surrogates for closeted or fearful male listeners, and proves that the body of the opera singer and the queer body are both restrained.

References

1993 non-fiction books
English-language books
Music books
Non-fiction books about theatre
Gay non-fiction books